The men's heptathlon event  at the 1999 IAAF World Indoor Championships was held on March 6–7.

Medalists

Results

60 metres

Long jump

Shot put

High jump

60 metres hurdles

Pole vault

1000 metres

Final standings

References
World Athletics Indoor Championships

Heptathlon
Combined events at the World Athletics Indoor Championships